Zaba, Żaba, Žaba, or Žába (Czech and Slovak feminine: Žabová or Žábová) is a surname. Notable people include:
 August Kościesza-Żaba (1801–1894), Polish Kurdologist
 Matt Zaba (born 1983), Canadian ice hockey player
 Zbyněk Žába (1917–1971), Czech Egyptologist

See also
 

Czech-language surnames
Polish-language surnames